The Shek Kong Airfield (ICAO: VHSK), formerly Royal Air Force Station Sek Kong or Sek Kong Airfield, is an airfield (airbase) located in Shek Kong, New Territories, Hong Kong.

The base currently houses air force units of People's Liberation Army Hong Kong Garrison (PLAHKG), as well as being open for restricted civilian use during weekends.

Royal Air Force history

Before the British handover of Hong Kong to China in 1997, the airfield was used by the British Forces Overseas Hong Kong, and was then a Royal Air Force station, officially known as  Royal Air Force Station Sek Kong, commonly abbreviated RAF Sek Kong.

From 1989, to 1993, RAF Sek Kong was also a Vietnamese Refugee Detention Centre.

It is currently used by the People's Liberation Army (PLA) during the week but, during weekends, members of the Hong Kong Aviation Club (HKAC) are allowed to use the airport facilities for operation of private aeroplanes and to conduct private flight training.

At RAF Sek Kong, the Royal Air Force operated a small force of a single squadron from 1950 to 1996.  It was a permanent assignment, with personnel and their families living in Sek Kong for three-year tours of duty.  The Royal Hong Kong Auxiliary Air Force (RHK AuxAF) was also a permanent air force unit in Hong Kong.

A partial list of RAF squadrons stationed at RAF Sek Kong before 1997:
No. 80 Squadron RAF: 3 January – 1 February 1950, 7 March – 28 April 1950
No. 28 Squadron RAF: 1 May – 7 October 1950, 28 March 1951 – 15 August 1955, 5 December 1955 – 14 June 1957, 17 May 1978 – 1 November 1996
Royal Hong Kong Auxiliary Air Force 1979–1993

A list of RAF aircraft stationed at RAF Sek Kong:

With a Vietnamese refugee camp using the runway from 1989 to 1993, the base hosted only helicopters after 1989 until the runway was reinstated in 1995.  However, no fixed wing aircraft of the RAF used the runway before the base was closed in 1996.

British Army
The British Army also operated a squadron of helicopters at RAF Sek Kong from 1970 until 1993, performing observation / reconnaissance and troop-lifting roles on the Hong Kong to mainland Chinese border, and supporting the army on exercises.  The Army Air Corps (AAC) unit was heavily involved in stemming the flood of illegal immigrants from mainland China.  No. 660 Squadron AAC operated from 1978 until the end of 1993.  The AAC squadron, 50 years old at the time, was the last overseas unit using Westland Scout helicopters.

Support equipment

Refugee camp, 1989–1993
From 1989, the base was also a refugee centre for Vietnamese boat people arriving in Hong Kong.  At the peak in 1992, the centre hosted 9,000 refugees.  During the time as a refugee centre, half the runway was closed and used for temporary housing (mainly tents, and some quonset huts).  As a result, only rotary aircraft operated from the base.  The refugee centre closed in 1993 and the runway was restored for use by fixed wing aircraft.

PLAAF base, 1997–present
The PLAAF has had a small presence in Hong Kong since 1997.  There is one PLA unit stationed in Shek Kong:
PLAAF Helicopter Regiment 39968
Hong Kong Special Aviation Unit — transport

The PLA ground and naval forces also use Shek Kong, mainly for training and Open Day use.

With the PLAAF operating helicopters, the runway is mostly used for civilian fixed wing aircraft.  There are four 'H's marked along the runway for the Harbin Z-9Bs to land, and avoided the need to create helipads at the base.

Private use
Whilst still under Royal Air Force operation, the Hong Kong Aviation Club (HKAC), Hong Kong's private recreational flying organisation, moved most of its aircraft to Shek Kong in 1994.  This was after the hours for general aviation (GA) at Kai Tak Airport (then the international airport for Hong Kong) were sharply reduced, to two hours per morning (07:00 to 09:00), as of 1 July that year.

See also

List of airports in Hong Kong
Former overseas RAF Stations
Hong Kong Aviation Club

References

External links

Helicopter Database - HK Sek Kong
Sek Kong
History of RAF
Crest Badge and information of RAF Sek Kong
Hong Kong Aviation Club（HKAC)

Military of Hong Kong
Chinese Air Force bases
Shek Kong
Airports in Hong Kong
Military airbases established in 1950
1950 establishments in Hong Kong